Glad Rags is an Australian children's television series which screened on the Nine Network in 1995.

References

External links
Glad Rags at Australian Television
Glad Rags at Nomad Films
Glad Rags at IMDb

Australian children's television series
1995 Australian television series debuts
1995 Australian television series endings